Chandni Chowk or Chandni Chowk Shopping Complex is one of markets in Dhaka, Bangladesh. It is situated in Mirpur Road, near to New Market. This market area is under New Market Thana. It is closed on Tuesdays of the week.

The market, which has 1,200 shops, sells a variety of products including clothes, jewellery and shoes. It is popular for buying and selling products on the occasion of Eid.

The incident of Eve teasing in the market on March 24, 2018 was criticized in the country. On October 21, 2020, a building of Chandni Chowk caught fire.

References

Bazaars in Bangladesh
History of Dhaka
Neighbourhoods in Dhaka
Retail markets in Bangladesh